MiFi is a brand name of a wireless router that acts as mobile Wi-Fi hotspot.

Mifi may also refer to:

 Mifi (department), a location in Cameroon
 MIFI d.o.o., Slovenian promoter of Metaldays music festival
 Mifi Rotten, a Chrome Shelled Regios character